No. 15 Flying Training School (15 FTS) is a former Royal Air Force flying training school that operated between 1939 and 1952.

References

Citations

Bibliography

External links

Military units and formations established in 1939
15